Luiz Ribeiro Pinto Neto (16 November 1946 – 11 February 2022), best known as Lula, was a Brazilian footballer who played as a winger and went on to become a manager. He died on 11 February 2022, at the age of 75.

Honours
Palmeiras
 Taça Brasil: 1967

Fluminense
 Campeonato Carioca: 1969, 1971, 1973 
 Taça de Prata: 1970

Internacional
 Campeonato Gaúcho: 1974, 1975, 1976
 Campeonato Brasileiro Série A: 1975, 1976

References

1946 births
2022 deaths
Sportspeople from Pernambuco
Brazilian footballers
Association football forwards
Campeonato Brasileiro Série A players
Brazil international footballers
ABC Futebol Clube players
Fluminense FC players
Sociedade Esportiva Palmeiras players
Sport Club Internacional players
Sport Club do Recife players
Brazilian football managers
Saudi First Division League managers
Fluminense FC managers
Ceará Sporting Club managers
Sampaio Corrêa Futebol Clube managers
Itaperuna Esporte Clube managers
Al-Ta'ee managers
Al-Fayha FC managers
Al-Ansar F.C. managers
America Football Club (RJ) managers
Ettifaq FC managers
Dubai Club managers
Hajer Club managers
Brazilian expatriate football managers
Brazilian expatriate sportspeople in Saudi Arabia
Expatriate football managers in Saudi Arabia
Brazilian expatriate sportspeople in the United Arab Emirates
Expatriate football managers in the United Arab Emirates